Gareus is a Mesopotamian deity who was introduced to Uruk (in modern-day Iraq) by the Parthians, who built a temple attributed to him there around 110 AD. Nothing is known so far of this deity outside of what has been found from the scattered remnants around that temple, which suggest that Gareus combined elements from both Hellenistic and Babylonian religious traditions.

See also 

 Temple of Gareus
 List of Mesopotamian deities

References 

Mesopotamian gods